Kotli Saru Khan is a village in Khadur Sahib in Tarn Taran district of Punjab State, India. The village is administrated by Sarpanch an elected representative of the village.

Population 
According to Population Census 2015, the Kotli Saru Khan village has the population of 11200 of which 5776are males while 4324 are females with over 200 above  families residing. Sex ratio of the village is quite higher than state Punjab. As per 2015 census, sex ration in the village is 1065 wherein Punjab is average of 846. Child sex ration is also very high, which is around 1170 as per census 2011. According to Census 2011 information, the location code or village code of Kotli Saru Khan village is 038309.

References 

Villages in Tarn Taran district